Franz Koglmann (born 22 May 1947) is an Austrian jazz composer. He performs on both the trumpet and flugelhorn in a variety of contexts, most often within avant-garde jazz and third stream contexts. An award-winning composer, Koglmann has performed or recorded with a variety of musicians, including Lee Konitz, Paul Bley, Bill Dixon, Georg Gräwe, Andrea Centazzo, Theo Jörgensmann, Wolfgang Reisinger, Enrico Rava, Yitzhak Yedid, Ran Blake, John Lindberg and many others. When the Romanian town of Sibiu commissioned Koglmann to write a piece, he brought together bits from Haydn's 27th symphony with a tape recording of Sibiu native Emil Cioran philosophisizing. In 2003, he received the highest Austrian jazz award, the Hans Koller Prize, in the category "album of the year".

Discography

As leader

 Franz Koglmann (1977). Opium for Franz. Pipe.

L'Heure Bleue (hatART, 1991)

 Franz Koglmann (2007). Nocturnal Walks

As collaborator
 Steve Lacy: Itinerary (hat ART, 1991)
Paul Bley: 12 (+6) In a Row (HatART, 1990, [1995])
Paul Bley: Annette (HatART, 1993)

Lee Konitz: We Thought About Duke (HatART, 1994) 

Bill Dixon: Opium (Between the Lines, 2001) compiles tracks from Flaps and Opium for Franz

References

Austrian jazz trumpeters
Male trumpeters
Austrian jazz composers
Male jazz composers
Third stream trumpeters
Living people
1947 births
Avant-garde jazz trumpeters
21st-century trumpeters
21st-century male musicians